The Shon-Sharaf Order or the Order of Glory of Service is a state award of the Republic of Uzbekistan. It was introduced in August 1995. It comes in two classes. The ribbon comes in blue, red, white and green.

Statute 
The Order of Glory is awarded to citizens for their devotion and courage in defending the country and strengthening the defense and national security of Uzbekistan.

Notable recipients (partial list) 

 Islam Karimov
Kadyr Gulyamov  
 Abdulla Xolmuhamedov
 Pavel Ergashev 
 Tulkun Kasimov  
 Ismail Ergashev

See also 

 Orders, decorations, and medals of Uzbekistan

References 

Orders, decorations, and medals of Uzbekistan